Changping station is a station on the Changping Line of the Beijing Subway. It was opened on 26 December 2015.

Station Layout 
The station has an underground island platform.

Exits 
There are two exits, lettered A and C. Exit C is accessible.

References

Railway stations in China opened in 2015
Beijing Subway stations in Changping District